Love Behind the Melody is the second studio album by American R&B recording artist Raheem DeVaughn, released on January 15, 2008 by Jive Records. The album was preceded by three singles, "Woman", "Customer" and "Text Messages". The album debuted at number five on the U.S. Billboard 200 chart, selling about 45,000 copies in its first week. Love Behind the Melody proved to be one of the most critically praised albums of 2008.

Critical reception 

Upon its release, Love Behind the Melody received rave reviews from music critics. At Metacritic, which assigns a normalized rating out of 100 to reviews from mainstream critics, the album received an average score of 83, which indicates "universal acclaim", based on 9 reviews.

Track listing

Charts

Weekly charts

Year-end charts

References

External links
 Love Behind the Melody at Metacritic

2008 albums
Raheem DeVaughn albums
Jive Records albums
Albums produced by Bryan-Michael Cox
Albums produced by Jack Splash
Albums produced by Scott Storch